The year 1809 CE in archaeology included many events, some of which are listed below.

Explorations

Excavations

Publications

First volume of Description de l'Egypte published

Finds

Awards

Miscellaneous

Births

Deaths

References

Archaeology
Archaeology by year
Archaeology
Archaeology